The Gangmasters and Labour Abuse Authority (GLAA) is the foremost intelligence and investigative agency for labour exploitation in the UK. Its role is to work in partnership with police and other law enforcement agencies such as the National Crime Agency to protect vulnerable and exploited workers and disrupt and dismantle serious and organised crime.

History
The Gangmasters Licensing Authority (GLA) was established on 1 April 2005 by the Gangmasters (Licensing) Act 2004, passed in the aftermath of the 2004 Morecambe Bay cockling disaster. The authority was handed a remit of preventing the exploitation of workers in the fresh produce sector — agriculture, horticulture, shellfish gathering, and all associated processing and packaging.

Initially, the authority sat under the control of the Department for Environment, Food and Rural Affairs (Defra) but on 9 April 2014 it was switched to the control of the Home Office. In making the announcement, Prime Minister David Cameron stated that the move would ‘strengthen its enforcement and intelligence capabilities’ by putting it directly alongside the considerable resources of the National Crime Agency.

On 30 April 2017, the GLA was renamed the Gangmasters and Labour Abuse Authority (GLAA) as part of reforms under the Immigration Act 2016.

The government invested an additional £2 million to extend the authority's remit, allowing it to prevent, detect, and investigate worker exploitation across the entire economy.

Specialist Labour Abuse Prevention Officers (LAPOs) were given powers under the Police and Criminal Evidence Act 1984 to investigate labour market offences, including the forced or compulsory labour element of modern slavery, across England and Wales.

A new Joint Slavery and Trafficking Analysis Centre opened in April 2017. The dedicated unit - made up of analysts from the National Crime Agency, police, Border Force, Immigration Enforcement, HM Revenue and Customs, and the GLAA - mirrors a joint working model successfully used to gather intelligence on terrorism.

The Immigration Act 2016 also created the position of the Director of Labour Market Enforcement, which provides strategic direction for organisations regulating the UK labour market:

 GLAA
 HM Revenue and Customs' National Minimum Wage unit
 Employment Agency Standards Inspectorate

The first Director of Labour Market Enforcement was Sir David Metcalf, who served until June 2019.

In July 2019, the government opened a public consultation on plans to establish a new single labour market enforcement body. This would combine the GLAA, HM Revenue and Customs' National Minimum Wage unit, and the Employment Agency Standards Inspectorate into one agency tackling labour exploitation and enforcing workers' rights.

Enforcement
The GLAA investigates circumstances where there is a risk of worker exploitation by gathering intelligence and working with police, government departments, and other enforcement agencies to target, dismantle and disrupt serious and organised crime across the UK labour market.

The Gangmasters (Licensing) Act 2004 established four specific offences:

 Operating as a gangmaster without a licence
 Obtaining or possessing a false licence or false documentation likely to cause another person to believe that a person acting as a gangmaster is licensed
 Entering into arrangements/using an unlicensed gangmaster
 Obstructing enforcement officers/compliance officers exercising their functions under the Act

In England and Wales, the GLAA uses the Modern Slavery Act 2015 to investigate forced or compulsory labour and human trafficking offences.

The Immigration Act 2016 also introduced Labour Market Enforcement Undertakings (LMEUs) and Labour Market Enforcement Orders (LMEOs) which can be used as an alternative or additional sanction for breaches of labour market legislation. The first LMEO in the UK was issued following a GLAA investigation into a couple from Leicester who illegally supplied workers to food factories in the city.

Regulation
The GLAA operates a licensing scheme regulating businesses who provide workers to the fresh produce supply chain, to make sure they meet the employment standards required by law.

Labour providers are assessed by GLAA compliance officers to check they are meeting the authority's licensing standards which cover health and safety, accommodation, pay, transport and training.

Employment agencies, labour providers and gangmasters who supply workers to the sectors listed below need a GLAA licence:

 Agriculture
 Horticulture
 Shellfish gathering
 Any associated processing and packaging

It is a criminal offence to supply workers without a licence or use an unlicensed labour provider. The maximum penalty for acting as an unlicensed gangmaster is 10 years in prison and an unlimited fine.

Prevention
The GLAA has a key role in working with businesses to prevent exploitation from happening in the first place. In October 2017, the authority launched the Construction Protocol, which is aimed at eradicating slavery and labour exploitation in the building industry.

The protocol commits signatories to:

 Work in partnership with the GLAA to protect vulnerable workers
 Share information, where possible, to help stop or prevent the exploitation of workers
 Work together to manage information sensitively and confidentially
 Raise awareness within supply chains
 Maintain momentum by communicating regularly

This protocol was followed by the creation of the Apparel and General Merchandise Public Private Protocol in November 2018, which has the same principles as the Construction Protocol but with a focus on the textiles industry.

The GLAA has also worked with the Downstream Fuel Association and other partners to set up the Responsible Car Wash Scheme, a project to tackle exploitation and non-compliance at hand car washes. It is supported by Tesco, Sainsbury's, Morrisons, ASDA, and Waitrose, all of whom joined the scheme to ensure that operators on their sites were abiding by the regulations.

Governance
The GLAA is a Non-Departmental Public Body governed by an independent Board and Chair appointed by the Home Secretary. It currently has eight members and is responsible for ensuring the GLAA fulfils its role of working in partnership to protect vulnerable and exploited workers.

The agency also sits alongside HM Revenue and Customs' National Minimum Wage unit and the Employment Agency Standards Inspectorate within the scope of the Director of Labour Market Enforcement (DLME), which sets the priorities for the organisations tackling labour market offences.

See also
 2004 Morecambe Bay cockling disaster
 Agency Workers Directive
 Temporary Labour Working Group
 United Kingdom agency worker law
 Modern Slavery Act 2015

References

External links
 

Home Office (United Kingdom)
Non-departmental public bodies of the United Kingdom government
Organisations based in Nottingham
2005 establishments in the United Kingdom
Government agencies established in 2005
Agricultural organisations based in the United Kingdom